The Feast Begins At Dawn is the debut album of Dutch thrash metal band Dead Head. It was recorded at Franky's Recording Kitchen, Nieuwleusen, the Netherlands from March 6 through July 1991 and released by Bad Taste Recordings.

Track listing

Personnel
Tom van Dijk – bass, vocals
Robbie Woning – guitar
Ronnie van der Wey – guitar
Hans Spijker – drums

References

Dead Head albums
1991 debut albums